The Azerbaijani National Time Trial Championships is a cycling race where the Azerbaijani cyclists contest who will become the time trial champion for the year to come.

Men

Elite

U23

Women

See also
Azerbaijani National Road Race Championships
National Road Cycling Championships

National road cycling championships
Cycle races in Azerbaijan